Pote Sarasin (25 March 1905 – 28 September 2000)  was the 9th Prime Minister of Thailand from the influential Sarasin family. He served as foreign minister from 1949 to 1950 and then served as ambassador to the United States. In September 1957 when Sarit Thanarat seized power in a military coup, he appointed Pote to be the Prime Minister of Thailand. He resigned in December 1957. Pote also served as the first Secretary General of the Southeast Asia Treaty Organization from September 1957 until 1963.

Early life and education
Pote Sarasin was born in 1905 to Hainam rice merchants and landowners at Bangkok. His father Thian Hee Sarasin (Thai: เทียนฮี้ สารสิน) was a doctor and rice merchant. Pote studied law at Wilbraham Academy in Wilbraham, Massachusetts and Middle Temple in London and was admitted to the English Bar. From 1933 to 1945, he practised as an attorney in Bangkok.

Political career
A close friend of the temporarily disempowered prime minister Phibunsongkhram (Phibun), Pote provided financial aid to the field marshal after his release from prison in 1946. In return Phibun had Pote appointed deputy minister of foreign affairs in 1948.

As foreign minister Pote was a wilful opponent of Phibun's attempts to recognise the French-backed Bảo Đại of Vietnam, a stance that had the full support of parliament, the press, and much of the government. Pote recognised the Bảo Đại's lack of popular appeal and doubted any chance of success and suspected that the Vietnamese might turn hostile, and explained to a New York Times reporter that "if they [the Thais] backed Bảo Đại and he failed, the animosity of the people of the country Vietnam would be turned against the Siamese." In the end Phibun discarded months of Foreign Ministry recommendations and on 28 February issued formal recognition of the royal governments of Laos, Cambodia and Vietnam. Embittered, Pote resigned. It was the only time a Thai foreign minister resigned on a matter of principle. Shortly afterward, he became ambassador to Washington once again.

On 21 September 1957, Sarit chose Pote to head the coup-installed government, mainly because the American-educated diplomat had good relations with the Americans. Under him largely free and fair elections were held in December. He resigned from the premiership that same month to resume his post as Secretary General of SEATO.

Family

Pote was a scion of the Sarasin family, one of Bangkok's oldest and wealthiest assimilated Chinese families. The Sarasins had always cultivated good relations with the bureaucratic elite of the 19th century, and by the early 1950s held substantial interests in real estate and rice trading. His father, Thian Hee (Chinese: 黄天喜, whose official title was Phraya Sarasinsawamiphakh), was the son of a traditional Chinese doctor and pharmacist who had immigrated from Hainan to Siam in the early 19th century.

Pote's sons are Pong, deputy minister of Thailand and a leading businessman and, Police General Pao, who once served as the Chief of the Royal Thai Police, and Arsa, who, like his father, was also one of the former foreign ministers of Thailand and was serving as the late King Bhumibol's Principal Private Secretary. All three sons–Pong, Arsa and Pao Sarasin had all served as the Deputy Prime Ministers of Thailand.

References

1905 births
Hainanese people
2000 deaths
Leaders who took power by coup
Pote Sarasin
Pote Sarasin
Pote Sarasin
Members of the Middle Temple
Wilbraham & Monson Academy alumni
Pote Sarasin
Secretaries General of the Southeast Asia Treaty Organization
Pote Sarasin
Pote Sarasin
Pote Sarasin
Pote Sarasin
Pote Sarasin